William Leslie Davis (born 15 December 1942) is a former New Zealand rugby union and softball player.

Rugby union
A wing and centre, Davis represented Hawke's Bay at a provincial level, and was a member of the New Zealand national side, the All Blacks, from 1963 to 1970. He played 53 matches for the All Blacks including 11 internationals.

Softball
Davis played as an outfielder for the New Zealand men's national softball team, known as the Black Socks, at the 1972 and 1976 softball world championships. In 2001 he became patron of the Rotorua Softball Association.

Honours
In 2006 Davis was inducted into the Hawke's Bay sports hall of fame.

References

1942 births
Living people
Hawke's Bay rugby union players
Male softball players
New Zealand businesspeople in retailing
New Zealand international rugby union players
New Zealand rugby union players
New Zealand softball players
People educated at Hastings Boys' High School
Rugby union centres
Rugby union players from Hastings, New Zealand
Rugby union wings
Sportspeople from Hastings, New Zealand